Cameron Highlands is an area in Pahang, Malaysia. It has three major towns: Ringlet, Tanah Rata and Brinchang. The Highlands have five settlements:  Bertam Valley, Kea Farm, Tringkap, Kuala Terla, and Kampung Raja. These eight communities are linked by a 34-kilometer-long road that stretches from Ringlet to Kampung Raja.

Towns

Ringlet 
Ringlet is the first town after the turnoff from Tapah. It is an agricultural hub. A wide variety of vegetables are grown there. The cool climate is favorable for growing passion fruit, strawberries and grapefruit.

Tanah Rata 
Tanah Rata is the administrative center of the area. The police station, government offices, hospital, schools, library, post office, shops, banks, eateries, inns, chalets, bus station and taxi stand are all present. The town is noted for its intricate network of jungle tracks leading to waterfalls, mountains, scenic spots or aboriginal villages. These tracks generally intersect with each other to form a “loop” around the city.

Brinchang 
Brinchang is the Highlands' second biggest town. The majority of its visitors are from Singapore or Malaysia. It is close to the central market, orchards, nurseries, museum and a golf course. Brinchang is also known for its “Night Market," an outdoor bazaar typically open on weekends and during school holidays.

Attractions 
Bertam Valley is a scenic spot about two kilometers from Ringlet. Its main activity is the cultivation of fruit, flowers and vegetables. It is the Highlands' entryway from Pahang via Sungei Koyan from Raub or Kuala Lipis.

Kea Farm is one of the highest villages in Peninsular Malaysia. It is adjacent to the tea estates and Mount Batu Brinchang (Malay: Gunung Batu Brinchang).

Tringkap is a farming enclave and is the area's focal point for growing vegetables. A high percentage of its crops are grown on terraces and the bulk of its production is exported to Singapore.

Kuala Terla is a farming commune. Its main activity is the cultivation of fruits, flowers and vegetables. It is approximately four kilometers from Kampung Raja. It has a mixed population including Chinese, Indians and Malays; however, the most common language spoken is Malay.

Kampung Raja is a residential area and the first town after the turnoff from Simpang Pulai. From Kampung Raja, it is possible to proceed to either Ipoh (Perak) or Gua Musang (Kelantan).

References

 Populated places in Pahang